The 1937 Philadelphia Athletics season involved the A's finishing seventh in the American League with a record of 54 wins and 97 losses.

Offseason 
On January 11, 1937, at the club's annual meeting, John Shibe officially retired from the day-to-day operations of the Athletics, although he had not been with the team since August 1936. Connie Mack, the team's other principal owner, was elected club president. Shibe died on July 11, leaving Mack as sole owner of the team.

Regular season 
The Athletics had refused the American League's directives to add numbers to all player uniforms, and would not post visiting players' uniform numbers on the scoreboard. The team argued that they posted both teams' full lineups to the scoreboard, then the only ballpark to do so, making numbers superfluous. The team relented to its fans who wished to be able to identify pitchers warming up in the bullpens, and players during pregame practice.

The club started to use uniform numbers during the 1937 season. They were the last team in the American League to do so.

The Athletics set a Major League record which still stands for the fewest batters hit by a pitch in a season, with only 5.

Season standings

Record vs. opponents

Roster

Player stats

Batting

Starters by position 
Note: Pos = Position; G = Games played; AB = At bats; H = Hits; Avg. = Batting average; HR = Home runs; RBI = Runs batted in

Other batters 
Note: G = Games played; AB = At bats; H = Hits; Avg. = Batting average; HR = Home runs; RBI = Runs batted in

Pitching

Starting pitchers 
Note: G = Games pitched; IP = Innings pitched; W = Wins; L = Losses; ERA = Earned run average; SO = Strikeouts

Other pitchers 
Note: G = Games pitched; IP = Innings pitched; W = Wins; L = Losses; ERA = Earned run average; SO = Strikeouts

Relief pitchers 
Note: G = Games pitched; W = Wins; L = Losses; SV = Saves; ERA = Earned run average; SO = Strikeouts

Farm system

References

External links
1937 Philadelphia Athletics team page at Baseball Reference
1937 Philadelphia Athletics team page at www.baseball-almanac.com

Oakland Athletics seasons
Philadelphia Athletics season
Oakland